Desert Rats: The North Africa Campaign is a 1985 video game published by Cases Computer Simulations.

Gameplay
Desert Rats: The North Africa Campaign is a game in which the North African Campaign of World War II in covered in detail.

Reception
M. Evan Brooks reviewed the game for Computer Gaming World, and stated that "For the more casual gamer, this game offers little. For the gamer intrigued by Rommel and Montgomery (wait a minute, was anyone ever intrigued by Montgomery?), Desert Rats offers the most detailed treatment available."

Reviews
Crash! - Jun, 1986
ACE (Advanced Computer Entertainment) - Dec, 1987
Computer Gaming World - Nov, 1991

References

External links
Text from additional reviews at Spectrum Computing

1985 video games
Amstrad CPC games
Computer wargames
North African campaign
Turn-based strategy video games
Video games about Nazi Germany
Video games developed in the United Kingdom
Video games set in Libya
World War II video games
ZX Spectrum games